James Fogle (September 29, 1936 – August 23, 2012) was the American author of the autobiographical novel Drugstore Cowboy, which became the basis for the film of the same name. He was born in Elcho, Wisconsin.

Fogle was in prison at the time of the film's release in 1989. A career criminal with a sixth-grade education, Fogle had been in trouble with the law many times starting in his teens and throughout the rest of his life. On May 27, 2010, Fogle was arrested with another man for robbing a drugstore in Redmond, Washington. He was held on $500,000 bail as he awaited trial.

Fogle was arrested again for robbing a Seattle pharmacy in 2011. On Friday, March 4, 2011, he was sentenced to 15 years and nine months in prison. On August 23, 2012, Fogle died of mesothelioma at the age of 75 in the state Monroe Correctional Complex in Monroe, Washington. Though Fogle wrote many short stories and novels, the only one that has been published is Drugstore Cowboy with the rest in the possession of Daniel Yost, a screenwriter and Fogle's friend.

Bibliography

 Adventure in Madness (short story)
 Drugstore Cowboy (novel) (1990)
 Doing It All (novel)
 Needle in the Sky (novel)
 Satan's Sandbox (novel)
 House of Worms (novel)
 Drugstore Cowboy Rides Again (Backside of a Mirror) (novel)
 Reckless Endearment
 Harse Apples
 Gold Gold Gold
 The Just and the Unjust
 Bird's Nest on the Ground (short story)

References

External links 
 

1936 births
2012 deaths
20th-century American novelists
American people who died in prison custody
American male novelists
Deaths from mesothelioma
People from Langlade County, Wisconsin
Prisoners who died in Washington (state) detention
Deaths from cancer in Washington (state)
American people convicted of robbery
20th-century American male writers